The Bobu is a right tributary of the river Olteț in Romania. It discharges into the Olteț in Bobu.

References

Rivers of Romania
Rivers of Dolj County
Rivers of Olt County